Slettheia is a district in the borough Vågsbygd in the city of Kristiansand in Agder county, Norway. The population was about 4,000 in 2014. It is the most populated immigrant settlement in Kristiansand. The district was the childhood home for Crown Princess Mette-Marit of Norway. Public transportation is available with local city buses every day. Slettheia has one elementary and one junior high, the closest high school is "Vågsbygd High School".

Demographic
Slettheia has about 4,000 residents (in 2014) and it is the district in Kristiansand with the highest percentage of immigrants in the city with about 36% of residents being immigrants. Approximately 31% are from Africa and Asia while another 4% are from Europe and North-America.

Transportation

Politics 
The 10 largest political parties in Slettheia in 2015:

Neighbourhoods
Fiskåtangen
Gislemyr
Kartheia
Nedre Slettheia
Slettheia sør
Slettheitoppen vest
Slettheitoppen øst
Slettheiveien

Media gallery

References

Populated places in Agder
Geography of Kristiansand
Boroughs of Kristiansand